La Bagatela was a Colombian political weekly. It was founded by Antonio Nariño.

References

Publications established in 1811
Spanish-language newspapers